The Redeemer of Souls Tour was a worldwide concert tour by English heavy metal band, Judas Priest, which was in support of Redeemer of Souls. It was their first tour since the conclusion of the Epitaph World Tour in 2012, which was originally dubbed as a farewell tour; the band has since retracted that statement.

The 2016 live album, Battle Cry, was released on 25 March of that year, featuring the band's performance recorded at Wacken Open Air on 1 August 2015.

Production

_

Tour dates

Box office score data

Setlists
The tour featured material from Redeemer of Souls for the first time. It also coincided with the 30th anniversary of the release of Defenders of the Faith and so the band played a number of songs from that album that hadn't been played since the mid-1980s. 

 "Dragonaut"
 "Metal Gods"
 "Devils Child"
 "Victim of Changes"
 "Halls of Valhalla"
 "Love Bites"
 "March of the Damned"
 "Turbo Lover"
 "Redeemer of Souls"
 "Beyond the Realms of Death"
 "Jawbreaker"
 "Breaking the Law"
 "Hell Bent for Leather"
 Encore 1
 "You've Got Another Thing Comin"
  Encore 2
 "Living After Midnight"
 "Defenders of the Faith"

 "Dragonaut"
 "Metal Gods"
 "Devils Child"
 "Victim of Changes"
 "Halls of Valhalla"
 "Love Bites"
 "March of the Damned"
 "Turbo Lover"
 "Redeemer of Souls"
 "Beyond the Realms of Death"
 "Jawbreaker"
 "Breaking the Law"
 "Hell Bent for Leather"
 Encore 1
 "The Hellion / Electric Eye"
 "You've Got Another Thing Comin"
  Encore 2
 "Painkiller"
 "Living After Midnight"

 "Dragonaut"
 "Metal Gods"
 "Devils Child"
 "Victim of Changes"
 "Halls of Valhalla"
 "Love Bites"
 "Redeemer of Souls"
 "Beyond the Realms of Death"
 "Jawbreaker"
 "Breaking the Law"
 "Hell Bent for Leather"
 Encore 1
 "The Hellion / Electric Eye"
 "You've Got Another Thing Comin"
  Encore 2
 "Painkiller"
 "Living After Midnight"

 "Dragonaut"
 "Metal Gods"
 "Desert Plains"
 "Victim of Changes"
 "Halls of Valhalla"
 "The Rage"
 "Turbo Lover"
 "Redeemer of Souls"
 "Beyond the Realms of Death"
 "Screaming For Vengeance"
 "Breaking the Law"
 "Hell Bent for Leather"
 Encore 1
 "The Hellion / Electric Eye"
 "You've Got Another Thing Comin"
 Encore 2
 "Painkiller"
 "Living After Midnight"

26 February 2015: "The Hellion/Electric Eye" and "Painkiller" were added for the further legs of the tour. Shortly they removed "Defender Of The Faith" from the set.
26 June 2015: "Love Bites" and "March Of The Damned" was removed from the set. 
16 October 2015: "Desert Plains", "The Rage" and "Screaming for Vengeance" (not played since 1986) were added, "Devil's Child" and "Jawbreaker" were removed from the set.

Support

For the first American leg, Judas Priest choose glam rock band, Steel Panther, to play with them. Their guitar player, Russ Parrish, had previously worked with Rob Halford in the 1990s in the band Fight.

Other bands that supported Judas Priest include:
 Motörhead (5 May 2015 in Santiago, Chile);
 Def Leppard (2 June 2015 in Oslo, Norway);
 Five Finger Death Punch (8 dates in Europe – France, Finland, Luxembourg, Germany, Poland and Czech Republic);
 Accept (22 April 2015 in Rio de Janeiro, Brazil);
 DragonForce (2 dates in Australia at February 2015);
 Michael Schenker's Temple Of Rock (6 dates in the United Kingdom, between November and December 2015);
 Saxon (4 dates in US in May 2015);
 Mastodon (12 dates in the US and Canada between October and November 2015);
 UFO (10 dates on the European Leg between 4 and 17 December 2015).
 Texas Hippie Coalition (14 May 2015 in Cedar Park, Texas, USA)

References

External links

2014 concert tours
2015 concert tours
Judas Priest concert tours